The December solstice, also known as the southern solstice, is the solstice that occurs each December – typically on 21 December, but may vary by one day in either direction according to the Gregorian calendar. In the Northern Hemisphere, the December solstice is the winter solstice (the day with the shortest period of daylight), whilst in the Southern Hemisphere it is the summer solstice (the day with the longest period of daylight).

The solstice also marks the changing of seasons in many countries. 21 December is the first day of winter (in the Northern Hemisphere) and the first day of summer (in the Southern Hemisphere).


Solar year
The December-solstice solar year is the solar year based on the December solstice. It is thus the length of time between adjacent December solstices.

The length of the December-solstice year has been relatively stable between 6000 BC and AD 2000, in the range of 49 minutes 30 seconds to 50 minutes in excess of 365 days 5 hours. After 2000, it has been growing shorter. In 4000, the excess time will be 48 minutes 52 seconds, and, in 10000, 46 minutes 45 seconds.

The length of the day near the December solstice

See also

Astronomy 

 March equinox
 June solstice
 September equinox

Holidays 

 Midsummer

References

Calendars
Astronomical events of the Solar System
Solstice